Manfred Pflugbeil (born 15 February 1942) is a retired decathlete who competed for the West Germany during his career. He set his personal best in the event (7413 points) on 27 August 1965 at a meet in Budapest.

References
trackfield.brinkster

1942 births
Living people
West German decathletes
Universiade medalists in athletics (track and field)
Universiade gold medalists for West Germany
Medalists at the 1963 Summer Universiade
Medalists at the 1965 Summer Universiade